KKRF (107.9 FM) is a commercial radio station that serves the Stuart, Iowa area.  The station broadcasts a Real Country format.

Until January 31, 2012, KKRF was licensed to Coon Valley Communications, Inc which was owned by Patrick Delaney who also owned KDLS (AM) in Perry, Iowa and KGRA in Jefferson, Iowa.

On February 1, 2012, Patrick Delany of Perry, owner of Coon Valley Communications, Inc, sold his company to Mel Suhr of Knoxville, owner of M&M Broadcasting, Inc.

With an agreement reached on January 27, 2012, and having an effective purchase date of February 1, 2012, M&M Broadcasting, Inc, a subsidiary of M and H Broadcasting, Inc, purchased Coon Valley Communications.   M and H Broadcasting, Inc is owned by Mel and Holly Suhr of Knoxville, Iowa.  M and H Broadcasting, Inc also owns KRLS 92.1 FM and KNIA 1320 AM at Knoxville.  They also own Home Broadcasting, Inc which owns KCII 1380 AM and KCII-FM 106.1 FM at Washington.

The station was originally licensed as KAGD on October 21, 1992, but changed callsigns to KKRF on July 1, 1993.

The transmitter and broadcast tower are located northeast of the intersection of 130th St. & Lewis Ave. in Adair County, 3.4 miles southeast of Casey, Iowa.

References

External links

Raccoon Valley Radio

KRF